F. exigua may refer to:

 Favartia exigua, a sea snail
 Fulgoraecia exigua, a planthopper parasite moth